Sergey Sergeevich Skobun  (born 4 March 1973) is a Ukrainian film director, producer and famous businessman, owner of the hotel chain “Magnat”. Was graduated from University of Chernivtsi, Faculty of Economics.

Biography 
The first time he tried himself in the cinema was in the Canary Islands, where he worked towards creating an entertaining and psychological TV show “Status Quo”.

In 2015, he started shooting a historical movie «Legends of Carpathians», starring Valeriy Kharchishin and Mariya Yaremchuk.

He directed a music video to the song of Druha Rika «Until I Went», which became a soundtrack to the movie «Legends of Carpathians».

Organizer of the international film festival "Bukovina".

List of awards and nominations

Gratitudes

References

External links
 Режиссер Сергей Скобун рассказал о визите Эштона Кутчера и Милы Кунис в Черновцы 
 Сергей Скобун: "Мама Милы Кунис очень разговорчивая и шустрая, а вот Эштон – довольно застенчивый" 
 Чернівці сьогодні | Сергій Скобун | Кіно в Україні.

1973 births
Chernivtsi University alumni
Ukrainian film directors
Ukrainian producers
Living people